Striped bass are perciform fish found all along the Atlantic coast, from Florida to Nova Scotia. They are of significant value as sporting fish, and have been introduced to many areas outside their native range.

Ecology
Striped bass anadromous (Morone saxatilis, also called rock or rockfish) are typical members of the family Moronidae in shape, having a streamlined, silvery body marked with longitudinal dark stripes running from behind the gills to the base of the tail. It inhabits rivers, bays, inlets, estuaries, and creeks. It is quite abundant in the Chesapeake Bay and its tributaries. There, it frequently grows over four feet in length and weighs over 22 kg (50 lb). A variety of angling methods are used, including trolling and surfcasting. The largest striped bass ever caught by angling was an 81.8 lb specimen taken in Westbrook, Connecticut on August 4, 2011. The striped bass will swim up rivers a hundred miles or more, and in Maine they are quite plentiful in the Penobscot River and Kennebec River. Further south in Connecticut some very large ones are taken both offshore and in the Connecticut River, and the waters surrounding  New York City have proven a fertile fishing ground with good sized specimens being caught during spring and summer months. In southern states such as Florida, striped bass are raised in hatcheries and are considered freshwater sportsfish.

In 2019, the recreational bass fishing season was cancelled before it started in the state of Virginia. This decision was taken due to the female spawning stock biomass (SSB) falling below the threshold deemed necessary for a healthy fish stock. In the state of Maryland, the fishing season remained open.

Distribution

East Coast striped bass are typically found from the Carolinas to Nova Scotia. The Chesapeake Bay is the major producer area for striped bass, with the Hudson River being a secondary producer. Spawning migration begins in March when the migratory component of the stock returns to their natal rivers to spawn. It is believed that females migrate after age five. These fish are believed to remain in the ocean during the spawning run. Males as young as two years old have been encountered in the spawning areas of the Chesapeake bay. The migratory range of the northern (Hudson stock) extends from the Carolinas to New York's Hudson River in the winter time and from New Jersey through Maine in summertime with the greatest concentration between Long Island, New York, Rhode Island, and Massachusetts. The migration of the northern stock to the south often begins in September from areas in Maine.

On the West Coast, striped bass are found throughout the San Francisco Bay and surrounding coastline. They are also found in the California Aqueduct canal system, and many California lakes such as Lake Castaic, Lake Skinner, Diamond Valley Reservoir, Silverwood Lake, Pyramid Lake, San Antonio Lake, and others. The striped bass have also developed into a prominent predator in many Colorado River lakes: Lake Havasu, Lake Mead, Lake Powell, Lake Pleasant and Lake Mohave. The Lake Mohave record striped bass weighed in at 60 lbs 14 oz. Furthermore, striped bass are now located all across the nation. Frequent "boils" or swarms, often consisting of twenty or more striped bass, may be observed in these lakes, representing an excellent fishing opportunity, especially with Pencil Poppers or other similar trout-looking surface lures where trout and other similar sized fish are often stocked.

In winter they keep to their haunts, and do not go into deep water like other fish of similar habits.  In the spring of the year the striped bass runs up the rivers and into other fresh water places to spawn - and then again late in the fall to shelter. The fall run is the best. They can be caught however nearly all the year round, and of all sizes.

Bait
Striped bass can be caught using a number of baits including: clams, eels, anchovies, bloodworms, nightcrawlers, chicken livers, mackerel menhaden, herring, shad, and sandworms. At times, striped bass can be very choosy about the baits they take. Because of the wide variety of baits that are known to work and their finicky nature, they are considered among fishermen as being an opportunistic or "lazy" feeder. However, it is estimated that 90% of their diet is fish.

Fishing Technique
Fishing for stripers can be a rewarding experience for the experienced fisherman.  Keepers caught from the surf commonly weigh in from 20 to 40 pounds.  But they can grow much larger.

Stripers are migratory, and will move up and down the coasts and into river systems to spawn, and back out to sea throughout the year.  But close in to the shoreline, the bite begins when the water reaches 50 degrees Fahrenheit in the spring, tapers off as the hot summer approaches, and returns in force in the fall.  The bite activity then dies down again as water temperatures drift back down to the forties in late fall and early winter.

Fishermen often use fluorocarbon leaders when fishing for Stripers so that the fish can not see the fishing line in the water.

Beach
Successful striper fishing from the surf comes down to equipment, timing, structure and bait.

Basic equipment for surf fishing includes a surf rod and reel (either conventional or spinning), a sand spike, appropriate terminal tackle, appropriate line, and appropriate clothing.  A typical surf rod is 8–12 feet long, and after casting, is held vertical in a sand spike.  Typical line is 20 pound test monofilament or 30-60 pound test braided line.  Terminal tackle includes a large array of devices, each a variation of the same theme: the thing at the end of your line with the hook on it.  Baits, lures, plugs, poppers, and artificials all have their place in fishing for stripers in the surf.  Each has its advantage, depending on conditions and fish activity.

Timing is a rich subject amongst fishermen.  High tide, low tide, dawn, dusk, lunar phases, water clarity and temperature, barometric pressure, storm fronts, these are all subjects that the striper fishermen will familiarize himself with, regardless if fishing from the surf, jetty, boat, or bridge.

Structure refers to the physical structure of the bottom of the ocean along shore.  Sand bars, washes, holes, points, cuts, sloughs, pockets, rips, and the drop off are all structures.  Most cannot be seen from line of sight, since they are under water.  Stripers love three things: moving water, structure, and food.  All three can be found within yards of the shoreline.  And since stripers and their food sources have tendencies to hold to certain types of structure at certain times of the day and year, it becomes important for the fisherman to learn how to read structure.

Spear
The IGFA World Spear Fishing Record Striped Bass was shot by Dave Hochman off the coast of Rhode Island in 2008.  Dave's striper came in at 55 inches, 68.4 pounds.  Dave took the fish during a free dive at a depth of 54 feet.

Jetty
Safety is a key issue for jetty fishermen.  One slip or large wave can mean broken bones, or worse.  The jetty fisherman's two best pieces of equipment are a sound mind and a stout pair of jetty spikes.

Bridge
Bridge fishing for stripers can also be productive.  However, preparation and planning are key.  Heavy duty equipment and line is a requirement.  A bridge net and grappling hook are also useful, as is a plan for landing the fish if it cannot be hauled up out of the water.  Bridge fishermen will often walk the rod to one end of the bridge, passing it around light poles and signs, in order to access the water from a lower elevation to land the fish.

Trolling from a boat running parallel to the bridge is a common technique used to catch striped bass.  In order to maintain control of the trolled lure and to prevent becoming snagged on the pilings, a heavy weight is attached to a three-way swivel.  The lure is attached to the other part of the swivel, with the main line rising from the third part.  This allows the boater to troll a lure down near the bottom where the larger fish are, without having to let out too much line near the bridge.

Boat
Fishing for stripers from a boat requires good knowledge of tidal conditions and how they relate to feeding patterns of stripers. Boat-fishing techniques include trolling live bait or artificial lures, drifting or 'livelining' live bait such as eels, bunker or other baitfish, bottom-fishing with cut bait such as clams or bunker chunks, jigging with weighted lures, and flycasting.

Kayak fishing for stripers is also on the increase, with the introduction of stable fishing oriented kayaks.

See also
 Bass fishing

References

Further reading
 
 
 
 
 
 
 
 
 
Muller D.J. (2007) The Surfcaster's Guide to the Striper Coast. Burford Books  ISBN 13 9781580801447

Muller D.J. (2008) Striper Strategies. Burford Books New Jersey  ISBN 9781580801522

External links

 Catch and release guide for striped bass

Recreational fishing
Morone